Vivian Silveira Amorim (born March 20, 1993), more known as Vivian Amorim, is a Brazilian presenter and reporter.

Career

Miss Amazonas and Miss Brazil 
Vivian Amorim started modeling career at 15, she was acclaimed Miss Amazonas 2012, after winning 20 candidates for the title. She represented the state in Miss Brasil 2012, being among the 10 semifinalists, winning in the category of best typical costume.

Television 
In the year 2015, she was a local program reporter for the Band (channel) network. Amorim performed interviews with artists during shows in the Amazonas. In the years 2014 and 2015, she was presented alongside other ceremonialists the Miss Amazonas, by local TV.

Big Brother Brasil
On January 23, 2017, the manaura was officially announced by host Tiago Leifert as one of the thirteen official contestants who would be on the seventeenth season of Big Brother Brasil, the Brazilian version of the reality series Big Brother, which aired on Rede Globo.

On April 12, 2017, after 81 days of confinement, she received 41% of the votes in the final public vote, ending as a runner-up in the competition, where Emilly Araújo was crowned winner with 58% of votes and retired Ieda Woberto as second runner-up with 1% of the votes, as prize Amorim  won R$150.000,00 reais.

After Big Brother Brasil
Also in 2017, she was awarded a certificate of honor to the Merit in recognition, according to the honor, "her brilliant participation in the reality representing with honor, dignity, and beauty the whole of Amazonas society" by the Legislative Assembly of Amazonas (Aleam).

On January 11, 2018, she joined Big Brother Brasil 18 as a reporter, along with Fernanda Keulla, winner of Big Brother Brasil 13. The following year, they returned to the role, being joined by Big Brother Brasil 18 finalist Ana Clara Lima.

The reporters stood in front of RedeBBB, a program aimed at the Internet audience interacting on social networks and the main BBB calls during a TV Globo TV program. The program is about a chat with the eliminated ones and of roundtables on the most commented subjects of the edition. She also acts on SelfieBBB.

In April 2018, it was announced that she would be part of Video Show as a repórter, along with Keulla. In July 2018 both were relocated as presenters of the program, alongside Sophia Abrahão and Ana Clara.

in 2020, she joined the team of presenters of the TV Network Multishow, as one of the hosts of  A Eliminação.

Filmography

References

External links

 

1993 births
Living people
People from Manaus
Brazilian people of Portuguese descent
Brazilian television presenters
Brazilian female models
Big Brother (franchise) contestants
Brazilian women television presenters
Big Brother Brasil